Variable pitohui may refer to several species of birds:

 Northern variable pitohui, found on New Guinea and neighboring islands
 Southern variable pitohui, found on New Guinea and neighboring islands

Birds by common name